Rakhigarhi or Rakhi Garhi is a village and an archaeological site belonging to the Indus Valley civilisation in Hisar District of the northern Indian state of Haryana, situated about 150 km northwest of Delhi. It was part of the mature phase of the Indus Valley Civilisation, dating to 2600-1900 BCE. It was among the largest settlements of the ancient civilisation, though most of it remains unexcavated. The site is located in the Ghaggar-Hakra River plain, some 27 km from the seasonal Ghaggar river.

Most scholars believe it to be between 80 hectares and 100+ hectares in area. Some Indian archaeologists, however, have claimed that the earliest settlements in Rakhigarhi predate the Indus Valley Civilization, and the site itself is 550 hectares in size. Only 5% of the site has been excavated; much of the area is yet to be excavated and published.

Another related excavation sites in the area are Mitathal and the smaller site Lohari Ragho, which are still awaiting excavation.

Site details

Site location

It is located in the Ghaggar-Hakra river plain, some 27 km from the seasonal Ghaggar river.  Today, Rakhigarhi is a small village in Haryana State, India.

There are many other important archaeological sites in this area, in the old river valley to the east of the Ghaggar Plain. Among them are Kalibangan, Kunal, Balu, Bhirrana, and Banawali.

According to Jane McIntosh, Rakhigarhi is located in the valley of the prehistoric Drishadvati River that originated in Siwalik Hills. Chautang is a tributary of Sarsuti river which in turn is tributary of Ghaggar river.

Size and number of mounds 

Rakhigarhi has 11 excavation mounds, which follow the naming convention of "RGR-x" e.g.

By 2020, only 5% of the site had been excavated by the ASI and Deccan College.

Significance

Size and age 

Most scholars, including Gregory Possehl, Jonathan Mark Kenoyer, Raymond Allchin and Rita P. Wright believe it to be between 80 hectares and 100+ hectares in area. Furthermore, Possehl did not believe that all mounds in Rakhigarhi belong to the same Indus Valley settlement, stating, "RGR-6, a Sothi-Siswal site known as Arda, was probably a separate settlement."

Nearby important sites and cultures 

Rakhigarhi, being the largest town and regional trade centre of IVC era, is surrounded by numerous IVC sites nearby in Haryana, Rajasthan and Punjab along the Gagghar-Hakra river course. The important ones among those are the Bhirrana (4 phases of IVC with earliest dated to 8th-7th millennium BCE) 86 km northwest, Kunal (belonging to Kunal cultural which is the cultural ancestor of Rehman Dheri site) 75 km northwest, Siswal (belonging to Sothi-Siswal culture dated to 3800 BC, contemporaneous to Early-Harappan Phase) 75 km west, and Kalibangan (another large regional IVC city with several phases starting from Early harappan phase) 235 km west, and few more.

Excavations

Chronology of excavations 

While the earliest excavation of IVC sites started from Harappa in 1921-1922 and Mohenjo-daro in 1931, the excavations at Rakhigarhi were first carried out in 1969, followed by more excavations in 1997–98, 1998–99 and 1999–2000, between 2011–16 and 2021 onward. There are 11 mounds in Rakhigarhi which are named RGR-1 to RGR-11, of which RGR-5 is thickly populated by establishment of Rakhishahpur village and is not available for excavations. RGR-1 to RGR-3, RGR6 to RGR9 and some part of RGR-4 are available for excavations. 
 
In 1963, Archaeological Survey of India (ASI) began excavations at this site, and, though little has been published about the excavations.

In 1969, Kurukshetra University's team studied and documented the site led by its Dean of Indic studies Dr. Suraj Bhan.

In 1997–98, 1998–99 and 1999–2000, ASI team began to excavate the site again, which was led by its director Dr. Amrender Nath who published his findings in scholarly journals. After 2000, excavations were stopped for years because of a CBI investigation on the misuse of funds. Much of the findings are donated to the National Museum, New Delhi.

From 2011 to 2016, Deccan College carried out several substantial excavations led by its then Vice Chancellor and archaeologist Dr. Vasant Shinde, several members of the team published their findings in various academic journals.

From 2021 onward, more excavation by ASI commenced. Central University of Haryana and Dr Vasant Shinde also expressed interest in commencing excavation.

Dating

ASI has carbon dated mound labelled RGR-1, RGR-2, RGR-6 and RGR-7. The RGR-6 has two layers of Preharappan Phase dating to 5,640 years before present (BP) and 5,440 (BP). The RGR-1 has Early Harappan Phase dating to 5,200 and 4,570 years BP. The RGR-2 also has Early Harappan Phase dated to 5,200 and 4,570 years as well as two additional samples belonging to Mature Harappan Phase dating to 4,040 and 3,900 years BP. RGR-7, which is a cemetery or a burial site from Mature Harappan Phase, dates back to 4600 BP.

In 2014 six radiocarbon datings from excavations at Rakhigarhi between 1997 and 2000 were published, corresponding to the three periods at the site as per archaeologist Amarendra Nath (Pre-formative, Early Harappan, and Mature Harappan). Mound RGR-6 revealed a Pre-formative stage designated as Sothi Phase with the following two datings:  and  years before present, converted to  B.C.E. and  B.C.E.

Discoveries
[[File:Skeleton harappa.JPG|thumbnail|The skeleton of male (code named as 11A), part of the "Rakhigarhi love birds" couple, with his skull facing towards female (code named as 11B, not seen in the picture) found at Rakhigarhi and now on display in the National Museum.]]

Findings confirm both early and mature Harappan phases and include 4,600-year-old human skeletons, fortification and bricks.

Planned city 

The ASI's detailed excavation of the site revealed the size of the lost city and recovered numerous artefacts, some over 5,000 years old. Rakhigarhi was occupied at Early Harappan times. Evidence of paved roads, drainage system, large rainwater collection, storage system, terracotta bricks, statue production, and skilled working of bronze and precious metals have been uncovered. Jewellery, including bangles made from terracotta, conch shells, gold, and semi-precious stones, have also been found.

Digging so far reveals a well planned city with 1.92 m wide roads, a bit wider than in Kalibangan. The pottery is similar to Kalibangan and Banawali. Pits surrounded by walls have been found, which are thought to be for sacrificial or some religious ceremonies. There are brick lined drains to handle sewage from the houses. Terracotta statues, weights, bronze artifacts, comb, copper fish hooks, needles and terracotta seals have also been found. A bronze vessel has been found which is decorated with gold and silver. A gold foundry with about 3000 unpolished semi-precious stones has been found. Many tools used for polishing these stones and a furnace were found there. A burial site has been found with 11 skeletons, with their heads in the north direction. Near the heads of these skeletons, utensils for everyday use were kept. The three female skeletons have shell bangles on their left wrists. Near one female skeleton, a gold armlet has been found. In addition semi precious stones have been found lying near the head, suggesting that they were part of some sort of necklace.

Granary

A granary belonging to mature Harappan phase (2600 BCE to 2000 BCE) has been found here. Granary is made up of mud-bricks with a floor of ramped earth plastered with mud. It has 7 rectangular or square chambers. Significant traces of lime & decomposed grass are found on the lower portion of the granary wall indicating that it can also be the storehouse of grains with lime used as insecticide & grass used to prevent entry of moisture. Looking at the size, it appears to be a public granary or a private granary of elites.

Tools 

Hunting tools like copper hafts and fish hooks have been found here. Presence of various toys like mini wheels, miniature lids, sling balls, animal figurines indicates a prevalence of toy culture. Signs of flourishing trade can be seen by the excavation of stamps, jewelry and 'chert' weights. Weights found here are similar to weights found at many other IVC sites confirming presence of standardized weight systems.

Culture, clothing and worship

Fire altars and apsidal structures were revealed in Rakhigarhi.

Cotton cloth traces preserved on silver or bronze objects were known from Rakhigarhi, Chanhudaro and Harappa. An impressive number of stamps seals were also found at this site.

 Cemetery and burial sites 

A cemetery of Mature Harappan period is discovered at Rakhigarhi, with eight graves found. Often brick covered grave pits had wooden coffin in one case. Different type of grave pits were undercut to form an earthen overhang and body was placed below this; and then top of grave was filled with bricks to form a roof structure over the grave.

So far 53 burial sites with 46 skeletons have been discovered. Anthropological examination done on 37 skeletons revealed 17 to be of adults, 8 to be of subadults while the age of 12 skeletons could not be verified. Sex detection of 17 skeletons was successful out of which 7 were male and 10 female skeletons. Most of the burials were typical burials with skeletons in a supine position. Atypical burials had skeletons in a prone position. Some graves are just pits while some are brick lined and contain pottery. Some of them also had votive pots with animal remains symbolizing offerings to the dead. Bone remains of secondary burials were not charred hence ruling out the possibility of cremation practices. While these burials retained many of the Harappan features, group burials and prone position burials are distinct. Paleo-parasitical studies and DNA analysis to determine the lineage is being undertaken.

Parasite eggs which were once existed in the stomach of those buried were found in the burial sites along with human skeletons. Analysis of Human aDNA obtained from human bones as well as analysis of parasite and animal DNA will be done to assert origins of these people.

 Skeleton finds 

In April 2015, four 4,600-year-old complete human skeletons were excavated from mound RGR-7. These skeletons belonged to two male adults, one female adult (classified as 'I6113') and one child. Pottery with grains of food as well as shell bangles were found around these skeletons. As the skeletons were excavated scientifically without any contamination, archaeologists think that with the help of latest technology on these skeletons and DNA obtained, it is possible to determine how Harappans looked like 4500 years ago. Shinde et al. (2019) have carried out DNA-tests on a single skeleton. Results announced in September 2018, and a paper published in Cell Magazine in 2019, show that the DNA did not include any traces of steppe ancestry, in line with the Aryan migration theory, which says that Indo-Aryans migrated to India from the steppes after the Harappan civilization had started to disintegrate. The DNA of a male skeleton (classified as 'I4411') shows affinity with present-day South Indian tribal populations, most notably the Irula people. A total of 61 skeletons were found till 2016.

Two of the skeletons, a man between 35 and 40 years old and women in early 20s, who died around the same time. They were found buried together side by side with men's head facing the women. Their ceremonial burial indicates that they were not in illicit relationship and the lovebirds were likely married to each other. Pots found in their grave likely carried food and water as offering to the dead. The agate found near he collar bone of the male was likely part of a necklace.Vasant Shinde1, et al, 2018, A young couple's grave found in the Rakhigarhi cemetery of the Harappan Civilization, Anatomy & Cell Biology, vol 51 (3), pp. 200-204. Their skeleton had no abnormalities, injuries or sign of disease. They were both likely "quite healthy"'' at the time of their death.

Site conservation

Issues

Endangered heritage site 

In May 2012, the Global Heritage Fund declared Rakhigarhi one of the ten most endangered heritage sites in Asia facing the threat of irreparable loss and destruction due to development pressures, insufficient management and looting. A 2012 study by the Sunday Times found that the site is not being looked after; the iron boundary wall is broken, and villagers sell the artefacts they dig out of the site and parts of site are now being encroached by private houses. Due to the lack of site protection the site is being destroyed by soil erosion, encroachments, illegal sand lifting, theft of archaeological artifacts for illegal sale. It is a punishable crime to sell or buy artifacts found in the ancient sites. 80% of mound 6 – a residential site of Harappan Era and 7 which is a burial site where 4 human skeletons were recovered in 2015 have been destroyed due to cultivation and soil mining.

Site encroachments

Parts of mounds R4 and R5 have been encroached by the villagers who have built 152 houses. The ASI has only 83.5 acres of the 550-hectare site that entails 11 archaeological mounds, due to encroachments and pending court cases for the removal of the encroachments.

Site development

Site rehabilitation and preservation 

In February 2020, Union Finance Minister Nirmala Sitharaman announced that the site of Rakhigarhi would be developed as an iconic site. ASI has commenced the plan to remove encroachments from the site, including 152 houses on the R4 and R5 mounds. Villages, whose houses in the site will be removed, will be relocated and rehabilitated in the housing flats on another location.

Site museum and lake 

Rakhigarhi, which is an Indus Valley civilisation site, also has a museum developed by the state government. There is also Haryana Rural Antique Museum 60 km away, which is maintained by CCS HAU in its Gandhi Bhawan, exhibits evolution of agriculture and vanishing antiques. Jahaj Kothi Museum, named after George Thomas, is located inside Firoz Shah Palace Complex and maintained by Archaeological Survey of India.

To develop Rakhigarhi as the global heritage, two johad (water bodies) across the road to museum are developed as lakes. The lake has been deepened by digging and traditional ghats with burji on the banks of lake have been constructed. A park is developed the spare land of the lake. A walking track around the lake, with shady trees and fruit trees, has been constructed for the tourists. The traditional ghats represent the past scenario when paleo-Drishadvati river use to flow through Rakhigarhi which had ghats for transporting goods for trade, via Lothal port and Dholavira, as far as Mesopotamia (ancient cities of Elam and Sumer).

See also

 Indus Valley civilization related
 List of Indus Valley Civilization sites
Mohenjo-daro main site of Indus valley civilization.
 Bhirrana, 4 phases of IVC with earliest dated to 8th-7th millennium BCE
 Kalibanga, an IVC town and fort with several phases starting from Early harappan phase
 Rakhigarhi, one of the largest IVC city with 4 phases of IVC with earliest dated to 8th-7th millennium BCE
 Kunal, cultural ancestor of Rehman Dheri
 List of inventions and discoveries of the Indus Valley Civilization
 Hydraulic engineering of the Indus Valley Civilization
 Sanitation of the Indus Valley civilisation
 Periodisation of the Indus Valley civilisation
 Pottery in the Indian subcontinent
 Bara culture, subtype of Late-Harappan Phase
 Cemetery H culture (2000-1400 BC), early Indo-Aryan pottery at IVC sites later evolved into Painted Grey Ware culture of Vedic period
 Black and red ware, belonging to neolithic and Early-Harappan phases
 Sothi-Siswal culture, subtype of Early-Harappan Phase
 Rakhigarhi Indus Valley Civilisation Museum
 History of Haryana
 List of Monuments of National Importance in Haryana
 List of State Protected Monuments in Haryana

Notes

References

External links

 Photo of the Rakhigarhi love birds buried together.
 BBC report with photo of the Rakhigarhi love birds buried together.
 2015 Man and Environment Journal article on Rakhigarhi burials.
Haryana Samvad Newsletter: Detailed report on Rakhigarhi with color photographs, page 1-15. 
 

Indus Valley civilisation sites
History of Haryana
Tourism in Haryana
Former populated places in India
Archaeological sites in Haryana
Archaeological sites in Hisar district
Tourist attractions in Hisar (city)
History of Hisar district